The Aracaju train crash, which occurred on March 20, 1946, is the worst ever rail disaster in Brazil; resulting in the deaths of 185 people and 300 injured.

The train concerned was a suburban service operating between Aracaju and Capela, Sergipe, and carrying about one thousand passengers. The locomotive, baggage car and three passenger cars were derailed whilst descending a steep incline near Aracaju, most of the dead being "smashed within the cars", "Many bodies were mutilated so badly that identification was impossible".

Grief-stricken relatives came to the scene and nearly lynched the surviving locomotive engineer who, depending on the source, either took refuge in a police station or fled the area later to surrender in the town of Laranjeiras, Sergipe. The train conductors also fled.

References

Railway accidents in 1946
Derailments in Brazil
Transport in Sergipe
1946 in Brazil
March 1946 events in South America